Samantha Dirks (born 18 December 1992) is a Belizean sprinter. She competed in the women's 400 metres at the 2017 World Championships in Athletics. Dirks also competed at the 2020 Summer Olympics in the women's 400 metres, where she placed 7th in her heat and did not advance to the semifinals. Her time, 54.16 seconds, was a season best for her, but she said afterward that she had been hoping for a better time. She was one of two flag bearers for Belize in the opening ceremony.

Dirks was raised in the San Fernando Valley in the United States, but she represents Belize, her parents' homeland, in international competition. She competed at the collegiate level for California State University, Northridge.

References

External links
 

1992 births
Living people
Belizean female sprinters
World Athletics Championships athletes for Belize
Athletes (track and field) at the 2018 Commonwealth Games
Commonwealth Games competitors for Belize
Place of birth missing (living people)
Central American Games silver medalists for Belize
Central American Games bronze medalists for Belize
Central American Games medalists in athletics
Athletes (track and field) at the 2020 Summer Olympics
Olympic athletes of Belize
Olympic female sprinters